Thijs Matthias Nijhuis (born 20 September 1992, in the Netherlands) is a Danish long-distance runner.

He finished tenth at the 2013 European U23 Championships (10,000 m), fourth at the 2015 Summer Universiade (5000 m), fifteenth at the 2017 Summer Universiade (5000 m) and tenth at the 2017 Summer Universiade (10,000 m). He also competed at the 2015 European Indoor Championships (3000 m) without reaching the final.

In 2019, he competed in the senior men's race at the 2019 IAAF World Cross Country Championships held in Aarhus, Denmark. He finished in 116th place. In 2019, he also competed in the men's marathon at the 2019 World Athletics Championships held in Doha, Qatar. He finished in 31st place. In 2020, he competed in the men's race at the 2020 World Athletics Half Marathon Championships held in Gdynia, Poland. At the Seville Marathon 2020 he finished in time 2:10:57, qualifying him for the 2020 Summer Olympics.

References

1992 births
Danish people of Dutch descent
Danish male long-distance runners
Danish male marathon runners
Athletes (track and field) at the 2020 Summer Olympics
Olympic athletes of Denmark
Living people
World Athletics Championships athletes for Denmark
Olympic male marathon runners
20th-century Danish people
21st-century Danish people